Nikolas Sylvester (born 20 January 2000) is a Vincentian swimmer. He competed in the men's 50 metre freestyle event at the 2016 Summer Olympics, where he ranked 61st with a time of 25.64 seconds, a national record. He did not advance to the semifinals. He also competed in five events at the 2018 Commonwealth Games.

References

2000 births
Living people
Saint Vincent and the Grenadines male freestyle swimmers
Olympic swimmers of Saint Vincent and the Grenadines
Swimmers at the 2016 Summer Olympics
Place of birth missing (living people)
Swimmers at the 2015 Pan American Games
Commonwealth Games competitors for Saint Vincent and the Grenadines
Swimmers at the 2018 Commonwealth Games
Pan American Games competitors for Saint Vincent and the Grenadines